The 2022 Masters Hockey World Cup an World Masters Hockey was a field hockey event. The event comprised a series of tournaments in both male and female competitions.

Age Groups
Across both the men's and women's tournaments, a total five age groups were played:

2022 World Cup: Nottingham
12 - 21 August 2022, Nottingham Hockey Centre, England

Men
Over 35's
Over 40's
Women
Over 35's
Over 40's

2022 World Cup: Cape Town
1-10 October; Hartleyvale Stadium, Cape Town

Men
Over 45's
Over 50's
Over 55's
Women
Over 45's
Over 50's
Over 55's
Over 60's
Over 65's

2022 World Cup: Tokyo
19 -29 October; Oi Hockey Stadium, Tokyo

Men
Over 60's
Over 65's
Over 70's
Over 75's
Over 80's

Venues
Following is a list of all venues and host cities.

Results

2022 World Cup: Nottingham

Men

Women

2022 World Cup: Cape Town

Men

Women

2022 World Cup: Cape Town

Men

References

External links
2022 World Cup: Nottingham
2022 World Cup: Cape Town
2022 World Cup: Tokyo

Masters Hockey World Cup
Masters Hockey World Cup
2022 in English sport
2022 in South African sport
2022 in Japanese sport
International field hockey competitions hosted by South Africa
International field hockey competitions hosted by England
International field hockey competitions hosted by Japan